The Falcon 9 v1.0 was the first member of the Falcon 9 launch vehicle family, designed and manufactured by SpaceX in Hawthorne, California. Development of the medium-lift launcher began in 2005, and it first flew on June 4, 2010. The Falcon 9 v1.0 then launched four Dragon cargo spacecraft: one on an orbital test flight, then one demonstration and two operational resupply missions to the International Space Station under a Commercial Resupply Services contract with NASA.

The two stage vehicle was powered by SpaceX's Merlin engines, burning liquid oxygen (LOX) and rocket-grade kerosene (RP-1).

The vehicle was retired in 2013 and replaced by the upgraded Falcon 9 v1.1, which first flew in September 2013. Of its five launches from 2010 to 2013, all successfully delivered their primary payload, though an anomaly led to the loss of one secondary payload.

Design

First stage 

The Falcon 9 v1.0 first stage was used on the first five Falcon 9 launches, and powered by nine SpaceX Merlin 1C rocket engines arranged in a 3x3 pattern.

The Falcon 9 tank walls and domes were made from aluminum lithium alloy. SpaceX uses an all-friction stir welded tank, the highest strength and most reliable welding technique available.

The Falcon 9 v1.0 first stage used a pyrophoric mixture of triethylaluminum-triethylborane (TEA-TEB) as a first-stage ignitor.

Second stage 

The upper stage was powered by a single Merlin 1C engine modified for vacuum operation, with an expansion ratio of 117:1 and a nominal burn time of 345 seconds. For added reliability of restart, the engine has dual redundant pyrophoric igniters (TEA-TEB). The second stage tank of Falcon 9 is simply a shorter version of the first stage tank and uses most of the same tooling, material and manufacturing techniques. This saves money during vehicle production.

The Falcon 9 v1.0 interstage, which connects the upper and lower stage for Falcon 9, is a carbon fiber aluminum core composite structure. Reusable separation collets and a pneumatic pusher system separate the stages. The stage separation system had twelve attachment points (later reduced to just three in the v1.1 launcher).

Control 

SpaceX uses multiple redundant flight computers in a fault-tolerant design. Each Merlin engine is controlled by three voting computers, each of which has two physical processors that constantly check each other. The software runs on Linux and is written in C++. For flexibility, commercial off-the-shelf parts and system-wide "radiation-tolerant" design are used instead of radiation-hardened parts.

Four Draco thrusters were to be used for at least the second revision of the Falcon 9 v1.0 rocket second-stage as a reaction control system. It is unknown whether Falcon 9 ever flew with these thrusters; the second revision of Falcon 9 v1.0 was replaced with the Falcon 9 v1.1, which used nitrogen cold gas thrusters. The thrusters were used to hold a stable attitude for payload separation or, as a non-standard service, were also designed to be used to spin up the stage and payload to a maximum of 5 rotations per minute (RPM), although none of the five flown missions had a payload requirement for this service.

Development history

Funding 

While SpaceX spent its own money to develop its first launch vehicle, the Falcon 1, the development of the Falcon 9 was accelerated by the purchase of several demonstration flights by NASA. This started with seed money from the Commercial Orbital Transportation Services (COTS) program in 2006. SpaceX was selected from more than twenty companies that submitted COTS proposals. Without the NASA money, development would have taken longer, Musk said.

NASA also evaluated Falcon 9 development costs using the NASA‐Air Force Cost Model (NAFCOM)—a traditional cost-plus contract approach for US civilian and military space procurement—at  based on a NASA environment/culture, or  using a more commercial approach.

Production 

In December 2010, the SpaceX production line was manufacturing one new Falcon 9 (and Dragon spacecraft) every three months, with a plan to double the production rate to one every six weeks in 2012.

Launch history 

The v1.0 version of Falcon 9 was launched five times, all successfully carrying a Dragon spacecraft to low-Earth orbit, of which three achieved docking with the International Space Station.

One of those missions deployed its secondary payload in a lower orbit than expected due to an engine failure and safety constraints imposed by the ISS primary mission.

Reusability 

SpaceX ran a limited set of post-mission booster recovery flight tests on the early Falcon rocket launches, both Falcon 1 and Falcon 9. The initial parachute-based design approach was ultimately unsuccessful, and the company adopted a new propulsive-return design methodology that would utilize the Falcon 9 v1.1 vehicle for orbital recovery testing, but did use a Falcon 9 v1.0 booster tank for low-altitude low-velocity flight testing in 2012–2013.

From early days in the development of the Falcon 9, SpaceX had expressed hopes that both stages would eventually be reusable. The initial SpaceX design for stage reusability included adding lightweight thermal protection system (TPS) capability to the booster stage and utilizing parachute recovery of the separated stage. However, early test results were not successful, leading to abandonment of that approach and the initiation of a new design.

In 2011 SpaceX began a formal and funded development program—the SpaceX reusable launch system development program—with the objective of designing reusable first and second stages utilizing propulsive return of the stages to the launch pad. The early program focus, however, is only on return of the first stage.

See also 

 Falcon Heavy
 SpaceX launch vehicles
 SpaceX Dragon
 Comparison of orbital launch systems

References 

SpaceX launch vehicles
Vehicles introduced in 2010
Expendable space launch systems
Falcon 9